Delta Ceti, Latinized from δ Ceti, is a single, blue-white hued star in the equatorial constellation of Cetus. The star's apparent visual magnitude of +4.06 means it is near to the cusp of the faintest third of the stars that are visible the ideally-placed naked eye.

It moves minutely across the celestial sphere – yet just over four times more in right ascension than in declination. 

This is a Beta Cephei variable with a stellar classification of B2 IV. It varies in brightness with a period of 0.16114 days. Unlike most stars of its type, it does not display multiple periods of luminosity variation or multiple variations of its spectral line profiles. It has 8.4 times the mass of the Sun and 4.6 times the Sun's radius. The star is radiating around 4,000 times the Sun's luminosity from its photosphere at an effective temperature of roughly

Name
This star, along with α Cet (Menkar), λ Cet (Menkar), γ Cet (Kaffaljidhma), μ Cet, ξ1 Cet and ξ2 Cet were Al Kaff al Jidhmah, "the Part of a Hand".

According to the catalogue of stars in the Technical Memorandum 33-507 - A Reduced Star Catalog Containing 537 Named Stars, Al Kaff al Jidhmah were the title for five stars :γ Cet as Kaffaljidhma, ξ1 Cet as Al Kaff al Jidhmah I, ξ2 Cet as Al Kaff al Jidhmah II, δ Cet as Al Kaff al Jidhmah III and μ Cet as Al Kaff al Jidhmah IV (exclude α Cet and λ Cet.)

References

External links

B-type subgiants
Beta Cephei variables
Ceti, Delta
Cetus (constellation)
Durchmusterung objects
Ceti, 82
016582
012387
0779